Tile tracking is a technique most commonly associated with the game of Scrabble and similar word games. It refers to the practice of keeping track of letters played on the game board, typically by crossing letters off a score sheet or tracking grid as the tiles are played. Tracking tiles can be an important aid to strategy, especially during the endgame when there are no tiles left to draw, where careful tracking allows each player to deduce the remaining unseen letters on the opponent's final rack. The marking off of each letter from a pre-printed tracking grid as the tiles are played is a standard feature of tournament play.

Tracking sheets come in many varieties, and are often customized by players in an attempt to make the manual process of recording, tracking and counting tiles easier, more intuitive, and less prone to error.

Tile-tracking tools

Accurate tile-tracking depends upon knowing the total letter distribution and letter frequency of the game and then reproducing each tile in its correct frequency to facilitate the "accounting" of each letter as tiles are played. Pre-printed forms are popular for Scrabble games because they eliminate the need to continuously create such a list for each new game.

While Scrabble-branded 'tracker sheets' are available for purchase, customized tracking sheets of all types can be found freely available for downloading online, usually in .pdf format to facilitate printing. Scrabble club websites are the most common source for free pre-printed tracking sheets, and players often create their own tracking sheets.

Technology

The introduction of Scrabble for computers saw the practical application of automated score-keeping, but the rapid technological advances brought about by computers and the internet seemed only to serve the wider distribution of pre-printed tracking grids via downloads in terms of new tile-tracking tools.

Some websites offer online tile-tracking alternatives to paper and pencil. Users are required to manually input played tiles via the keyboard, and the input is then subtracted from a separate letter pool representing total tile distribution. The user then counts or otherwise calculates the status of the remaining tiles. Notes are made on a separate piece of paper as necessary. The user is still tracking and counting tiles manually, and the risk of receiving an inaccurate count through human error remains roughly equal to the non-technological option.

The migration of Scrabble to mobile devices and the popularity of the digital exclusive Words with Friends has seen the introduction of a dedicated tile-tracking app exclusively for games played on mobile app devices that automates the process of tracking tiles and requires no manual input.

Strategy

Advantages
The benefits of tracking and counting tiles are widely known among competitive Scrabble players and tile tracking is considered a standard part of tournament play. By tracking played tiles, players can learn more about what tiles remain unseen (either in the bag or on their opponent's rack), and can use that information to make strategic decisions about what tiles to hold, which squares to block, and which tiles to play to create advantages.

Tile tracking provides much of the data required to make many of the strategic decisions a player makes in the course of a game, and it has a key role in other strategic elements, including rack and board management.  It is considered especially critical in the end game (when there are no tiles left in the bag and seven or fewer tiles on each player's rack). At this point, ‘Scrabble is chess’ If both players have tracked the tiles correctly, each knows what tiles sit in the other's final rack. Assuming a close game, the win will go to the player who can plan and calculate the best move while taking into consideration the other player's possible responses—winning a close game by blocking an opponent's big play or setting up a high-scoring play the opponent cannot block.

Scrabble champion John Holgate notes that tile-tracking is particularly important in tight "bobbing" finishes when the bag is empty, and that many games are lost through "just not knowing what tiles your opponent has on her rack. You simply cannot calculate possible permutations if you are unsure about which letters are relevant."

Tracking can also tell a player if the bag is ‘vowel-heavy’ or 'consonant-heavy', how many S's or blanks are unseen, if an opponent is likely to have a bingo on their rack, or which tiles to play or conserve. For example, if Alice has the option of playing J(I)NN or J(I)LL, and four N's and zero L's remain unseen, then assuming both plays are otherwise equal (in terms of score, openings for the opponent), J(I)NN is likely the better play.

Letter frequency lists for both Scrabble and Words with Friends are easily accessible (some versions of Scrabble have the tile distribution directly on the board) and, unlike word lists, using them is not against tournament rules.

Whether done mentally, using a paper and pencil to track tiles, accessing a website program or a tile-counting app on mobile devices, every player has the same level of access to the same amount of readily available data——and even those unfamiliar with tile tracking as a studied technique are 'tracking tiles' every time they note that the 'Q' is still unseen or when they count the number of 'S's on the board before playing a word that can take an S hook to the opponent's advantage.

Disadvantages

Manual tile tracking can take away game time that would otherwise be used for finding words and making decisions about where to play them. Inaccurate tile tracking can lead to mistakes, such as setting up a spot for the player's 'S' when the opponent also has an 'S', or failing to block a winning play from the opponent. John Holgate, five-time winner of the Australian Championship recalls winning a game in the 1993 World Championship because his opponent inadvertently crossed off two ‘S’s with one stroke and failed to block the last S-hook.

The traditional method of manual tracking and counting tiles is generally understood to be a tedious and time-consuming practice.  As a result, some players track tiles in a simplified manner, usually by mentally tracking and counting the letters considered ‘key’ in any game: the Q, J, Z, X, the esses and the blanks. Often, it can take several months to a year for players to track all 100 tiles consistently without affecting their game play.

Outside the Scrabble community

The idea that an opponent can 'know what's in your rack' or have knowledge to what tiles remain unseen has been labeled in some discussions and reader comments related to Words with Friends as 'outside help' or 'borderline cheating.' and or using AI or Artificial Intelligence. While the practice of tile-tracking is considered an acceptable part of Scrabble  and sanctioned by NSA and NASPA rules, there is much colloquial evidence  to suggest that tile-tracking as both a legitimate technique and a strategic tool is not widely known outside of the Scrabble community. The similarities to the technique to 'card counting' is credited as contributing to some of the confusion among novice players.

Zynga's Words with Friends online game includes tile-tracking as a paid feature, known as 'Peeks'. This received some criticism as being a form of "cheating" that the Zynga both condones and profits from. The author concludes the article lamenting that Zynga's strategy was a threat to the integrity of the game, because of what it might cause 'loyal Scrabblers' to 'think' about the Words with Friends player: "I seriously doubt that loyal Scrabblers are going to be happy when they find out that the reason their friend has been winning lately is because he paid an extra $10 to have an advantage."

Examples

The value of tracking and counting tiles becomes apparent once a player understands that the game of Scrabble is as much about math as it is about vocabulary. Once possible plays have been discovered, the strategic decisions to be made have been described as being as "dark and complex as a forest."

Suppose that near the end of the game the eight tiles unseen by Alice are EFINRSSJ (seven on the opponent's rack and one in the bag). Alice can deduce that her opponent must have at least one S.
Suppose that near the end of the game the only way for Bob to win is to draw an S or a V, and that the 10 unseen tiles are AACEIINRSV.

References

External links
Official site of the National Scrabble Association

Scrabble